Fontenelle is a lunar impact crater that is located along the northern edge of Mare Frigoris, in the northern part of the Moon. To the northeast is the remnant of the crater Birmingham. Due to its location, this crater appears oval in shape when observed from the Earth because of foreshortening.

The rim of this crater is generally circular, but the edge is irregular and in some locations has a notched appearance. This is particularly true along the southwest and the eastern edges. The rim projects above the surface of the Mare Frigoris, and a wrinkle ridge runs several crater diameters to the southeast from the edge. The western rim is attached to rough terrain to the west and northwest.

The interior of Fontenelle has a wrinkled appearance along the northern rim. There is a low, wide central hill at the midpoint, and some rough ground to the west of this rise. Only a few tiny craterlets mark the surface of the floor.

To the south of Fontenelle on the lunar mare is a tiny crater that is surrounded by a blanket of high albedo material. This crater displays a resemblance to Linné on Mare Serenitatis. This feature lies about 15 kilometers north-northwest of Fontenelle G, and lacks a designation.

To the east of this crater is an unusual geometric configuration in the surface with an angular shape. This came to be known as "Mädler's Square", after the lunar selenographer Johann Mädler. It is roughly square in shape, but appears lozenge-shaped due to foreshortening. This feature was noted in many early books concerning the Moon.

Satellite craters
By convention these features are identified on lunar maps by placing the letter on the side of the crater midpoint that is closest to Fontenelle.

References

 
 
 
 
 
 
 
 
 
 
 
 

Impact craters on the Moon